No, Virginia... is the first compilation album by American dark cabaret band The Dresden Dolls. It was released in Europe on May 19, 2008 and North America on May 20, 2008. A special edition was released in the US via the iTunes Store and Amazon.com's MP3 service on June 10, 2008. The compilation is a companion piece to the band's second studio album, 2006's Yes, Virginia..., and contains tracks left over from recording sessions dating back to 2003, along with B-sides and tracks released on compilations. Singer Amanda Palmer has emphasized that the unreleased tracks from Yes, Virginia... were left off the album due to issues with the flow of the album, and not with the tracks themselves. Five tracks from No, Virginia... were recorded with Sean Slade in January 2008 at Mad Oak Studios. The songs themselves were written years ago but had not been recorded until the session with Slade. One song from the album, "The Kill", has been made available for streaming on the band's MySpace profile.

On April 4, 2008, the band began taking pre-orders for the album. Those who pre-ordered the album directly from the band were able to download a live recording of "Glass Slipper" during the week the album was released. The track may be one of the two live tracks the band considered adding to the standard track listing of the album.

Critical reception
Favorable reviews came from Billboard, The Boston Globe, The New York Times, and Paste.

Track listing
 "Dear Jenny" – 3:07
 "Night Reconnaissance" – 3:56
 "The Mouse and the Model" (demo) – 6:02
 "Ultima Esperanza" – 4:33
 "The Gardener" (Yes, Virginia... B-side) – 5:08
 "Lonesome Organist Rapes Page-Turner" (Yes, Virginia... B-side) – 3:42
 "Sorry Bunch" – 3:09
 "Pretty in Pink" (The Psychedelic Furs cover) – 3:57
 "The Kill" (Yes, Virginia... B-side) – 3:49
 "The Sheep Song" – 3:59
 "Boston" (Yes, Virginia... B-side) – 7:20

The special edition was digital only, whereas the standard edition was published both in CD and vinyl formats.

Personnel
 Amanda Palmer – piano, vocals, lyricist, composer, songwriter
 Brian Viglione – drums, guitar, backing vocals
 Sean Slade – production, mixing
 George Marino – mastering
 Benny Grotto – mixing, engineering
 Brian Koerber – assistant engineer

Charts

References

The Dresden Dolls albums
Albums produced by Sean Slade
Albums produced by Paul Q. Kolderie
2008 compilation albums
B-side compilation albums
Roadrunner Records compilation albums